Callimicra is a genus of beetles in the family Buprestidae, containing the following species:

 Callimicra acuminata Fisher, 1925
 Callimicra amicalis Obenberger, 1932
 Callimicra angustula Waterhouse, 1889
 Callimicra bartoni Obenberger, 1932
 Callimicra bicolor (Gory & Laporte, 1839)
 Callimicra bifasciata Obenberger, 1922
 Callimicra bourgeoisi Kerremans, 1914
 Callimicra brasiliensis Obenberger, 1922
 Callimicra brevis (Gory & Laporte, 1839)
 Callimicra breviuscula Waterhouse, 1889
 Callimicra bruchi Obenberger, 1922
 Callimicra bruchiana Obenberger, 1937
 Callimicra caesarea Obenberger, 1932
 Callimicra chloroptera Obenberger, 1932
 Callimicra chrysicollis Obenberger, 1922
 Callimicra collaris Kerremans, 1900
 Callimicra coraeboides Kerremans, 1899
 Callimicra cuprea Kerremans, 1897
 Callimicra cyanea Kerremans, 1897
 Callimicra cyanescens Fisher, 1933
 Callimicra cyanipennis Kerremans, 1899
 Callimicra cyanoptera Fisher, 1925
 Callimicra cylindera Kerremans, 1903
 Callimicra darwini Hespenheide, 1980
 Callimicra difficilis Obenberger, 1922
 Callimicra dimidiata Waterhouse, 1889
 Callimicra elongata Kerremans, 1896
 Callimicra embrikina Obenberger, 1936
 Callimicra festiva Fisher, 1925
 Callimicra frontalis Obenberger, 1922
 Callimicra hoscheki Obenberger, 1922
 Callimicra ignobilis (Kirsch, 1873)
 Callimicra iheringi Obenberger, 1932
 Callimicra inca Kerremans, 1899
 Callimicra janthinula Obenberger, 1932
 Callimicra longa Obenberger, 1922
 Callimicra lucidula Waterhouse, 1889
 Callimicra nigra Kerremans, 1897
 Callimicra obenbergeri Cobos, 1978
 Callimicra obscurepurpurascens Obenberger, 1938
 Callimicra occidentalis Obenberger, 1922
 Callimicra orchymonti Obenberger, 1937
 Callimicra paulensis Obenberger, 1922
 Callimicra peruviana Kerremans, 1899
 Callimicra pinguis Thomson, 1879
 Callimicra pygmaea Kerremans, 1900
 Callimicra riveti Kerremans, 1914
 Callimicra scapha Kerremans, 1896
 Callimicra scintillans Obenberger, 1932
 Callimicra scutellata Thomson, 1879
 Callimicra skrlandti Obenberger, 1932
 Callimicra stichai Obenberger, 1924
 Callimicra strandi Obenberger, 1922
 Callimicra subcyanea (Gory, 1841)
 Callimicra taciturna (Gory, 1841)
 Callimicra timialitha Thomson, 1879
 Callimicra vanrooni Obenberger, 1923
 Callimicra violaceipennis Waterhouse, 1889
 Callimicra viridifrons Fisher, 1925
 Callimicra viridis Kerremans, 1899

References

Buprestidae genera